Euxoa messoria, the darksided cutworm or reaper dart, is a moth of the family Noctuidae. The species was first described by Thaddeus William Harris in 1841. It is found from Newfoundland west to Yukon, south to Virginia and Missouri in the east and New Mexico, Arizona and California in the west.

The wingspan is 32–36 mm. The moth flies from July to September depending on the location. There is one generation per year.

The larvae feed on the leaves of apple, cultivated vegetables and flowers, as well as various other plants.

External links
Images

Bug Guide
The Noctuinae (Lepidoptera: Noctuidae) of Great Smoky Mountains National Park, U.S.A.

Euxoa
Moths of North America
Moths described in 1841